The Croton Aqueduct or Old Croton Aqueduct was a large and complex water distribution system constructed for New York City between 1837 and 1842. The great aqueducts, which were among the first in the United States, carried water by gravity  from the Croton River in Westchester County to reservoirs in Manhattan. It was built because local water resources had become polluted and inadequate for the growing population of the city. Although the aqueduct was largely superseded by the New Croton Aqueduct, which was built in 1890, the Old Croton Aqueduct remained in service until 1955.

Background
The island of Manhattan, surrounded by brackish rivers, had a limited supply of freshwater available. It dwindled as the city grew rapidly after the American Revolutionary War, and freshwater sources became polluted by effluent. Before the aqueduct was constructed, residents of New York obtained water from cisterns, wells, natural springs, and other bodies of water. But rapid population growth in the 19th century and encroachment on these areas as Manhattan moved further north of Wall Street, led to the pollution of many local fresh water sources.  Below Grand Street, a small number of well-off customers of the Manhattan Company had fresh water delivered to them, but that company was actually more focused on banking— it eventually became Chase Manhattan—and only paid as much attention to its water activities as it needed to avoid losing the state charter that allowed it to bank. The poor and the rest of the city were forced to rely on well water, often made palatable by adding alcoholic spirits, prompting temperance campaigners to call for the municipal provision of water.

The unsanitary conditions caused an increase in disease. Epidemics of yellow fever ravaged the city. A polluted aquifer, overcrowded housing, the lack of sewers, public ignorance of basic sanitary conditions, and the existence of polluting industries near wells and residential areas contributed to an unprecedented mortality rate of 2.6% (1 death per 39 inhabitants) in 1830. Then in 1832 cholera first reached New York in the deadliest epidemic to that date. The need for a new supply of fresh water was crucial.

Construction

In March 1833, Major David Bates Douglass, engineering professor at West Point Military Academy, was appointed to survey and estimate the proposed route. In 1837, construction began on a massive engineering project, to divert water from sources upstate, following a route surveyed by Douglass and supervised by Douglass' successor, Chief Engineer John B. Jervis. The Croton River was dammed, aqueducts were built, tunnels dug, piping laid, and reservoirs created.

The gravity-fed aqueduct dropped 13 inches per mile, 1/4" per 100' (~0.02%). An elliptical tube,  8.5 feet (2.6m) high by 7.5 feet (2.3m) wide, of iron piping encased in brick masonry was laid, sometimes in cuts, with conical ventilating towers every mile or so, to relieve pressure and keep the water fresh. Hydraulic cement was added where the aqueduct crossed rivers. It extended from the Old Croton Dam in northern Westchester County to the Harlem River, where it continued over the High Bridge at 173rd Street and down the West Side of Manhattan and finally into a Receiving Reservoir located between 79th and 86th streets and Sixth and Seventh Avenues; the site is now the Great Lawn and Turtle Pond in Central Park. The Full Flow, Design capacity, of the elliptical tube: 8201 CFM, or 88 MGD.

From the Receiving Reservoir, water flowed down to the Croton Distributing Reservoir, better known simply as the Croton Reservoir, a similar fortified tank located on Fifth Avenue between 40th Street and 42nd Street, where the New York Public Library Main Branch and Bryant Park are located today.  This reservoir was built to resemble ancient Egyptian architecture. New Yorkers came uptown for the fine view of the city obtained from atop its walls.

The aqueduct opened to public use with great fanfare on October 14, 1842. The day-long celebration culminated in a fountain of water that spouted to a height of 50 feet (15 m) from the beautifully decorated cast iron Croton Fountain in City Hall Park. Among those present was James Renwick, Jr., who went on to design Grace Church in New York, the Smithsonian Institution Building in Washington, D.C., and St. Patrick's Cathedral in New York, and was involved in the architectural and engineering work on the aqueduct as an up-and-coming 18-year-old.

Impact on the city
Water started flowing through the aqueduct on June 22, 1842, taking 22 hours for gravity to take the water the 41 miles (66 km) (at a velocity of ) to reach Manhattan. Even though only 6,175 houses had been connected to the system by 1844, the Croton water had already dramatically improved both domestic hygiene and interior design. Baths and running water were being built in the private homes of wealthy New Yorkers, and public bathing facilities were constructed for the masses. The water system had another inadvertent consequence. The decline in the number of residents drawing water from the city's wells resulted in a rise in the water table, which flooded many cellars. To address this problem, the city built sewers in many residential streets. By 1852,  of sewers had already been constructed.

About this time the German cockroach attracted attention and was called the "Croton bug" on the mistaken belief that the aqueduct brought the insects into the homes being connected to the new water supply system.

Despite its size, the capacity of the Old Croton Aqueduct could not keep up with the growth of New York City, and construction on a New Croton Aqueduct began in 1885 a few miles east. The new aqueduct, buried much deeper than the old one, went into service in 1890, with three times the capacity of the Old Croton Aqueduct. It currently supplies 10 percent of New York City's water. The Croton Receiving Reservoir continued to supply New York City with drinking water until 1940, when Commissioner of Parks and Recreation Robert Moses ordered it drained and filled to create the Great Lawn and Turtle Pond in Central Park. The old aqueduct remained in service until 1955. In 1987 the northernmost portion was reopened to provide water to Ossining.

Old Croton Trail 

It crosses the lawn of Lyndhurst, following the aqueduct's easement. The trail enters New York City on the eastern side of Van Cortlandt Park and runs through the Bronx alongside Aqueduct Avenue, and the trail continues under the southern part of University Avenue. 

Both the trail and the tunnel are part of the Old Croton Aqueduct State Historic Park, which was created in 1968 and encompasses the northernmost  of the aqueduct and its right-of-way, from Croton Gorge Park to the Yonkers-New York City line. It lies wholly within Westchester County but is under the jurisdiction of the Taconic Region of the New York State Office of Parks, Recreation and Historic Preservation.

The trail runs roughly parallel to Metro North's Hudson Line from northern Yonkers to Scarborough and is accessible from numerous stations on that line.  The trail briefly parallels the Rockefeller State Park Preserve and its trails. Access to the trail is easiest where it crosses Route 9, known variously as Albany Post Road, Broadway, or Highland Avenue.

Heading southbound into downtown Yonkers, the trail goes on-street at Bishop William J. Walls Place and N. Broadway, where it follows the sidewalk on N. Broadway for one block, and then makes a left onto Ashburton Avenue going east.  At Palisades Avenue, it makes a right and the trail bed restarts.

Remnants of the aqueduct still exist and can be seen along the trail, including 21 stone ventilators, three stone weirs (chambers which were used to empty the aqueduct for maintenance), and one "Keeper's House" located in Dobbs Ferry. The Keeper's House in Dobbs Ferry was built in 1857 and is the only remaining of four Keeper's Houses that is both on the aqueduct and open to the public.  The only other remaining Keeper's House is located in Ossining, but it was moved off the aqueduct, is privately owned, and is not open to visitors. A portion of the Old Croton Aqueduct, running from the Croton River to Manhattan, was listed as a National Historic Landmark in 1992.  The Croton Water Supply System was also designated as a National Historic Civil Engineering Landmark by the American Society of Civil Engineers in 1975.

The interior of the Old Croton Aqueduct has been explored and documented by The LTV Squad, Miru Kim and historian Steve Duncan.

Gallery

See also
 Croton Aqueduct Gate House
 High Bridge, New York City - part of the old Croton Aqueduct system
 New Croton Aqueduct
 List of National Historic Landmarks in New York
 National Register of Historic Places listings in northern Westchester County, New York
 National Register of Historic Places listings in southern Westchester County, New York

Notes

References

External links

 NYC GOV Water System History
 NYC GOV New York City's Water Story 
 "How a Massive Public Works Project Saved a Parched New York,"  by SAM ROBERTS, New York Times, December 4, 2017
Old Croton Aqueduct State Historic Park
Friends of the Old Croton Aqueduct
NYC Segment according to the NYC Department of Parks and Recreation
ASCE History and Heritage of Civil Engineering - Croton Water Supply System
"Croton Aqueduct" in 1902 Encyclopedia
 "The New Croton Aqueduct New York" Scientific American (1890-07-12)
John B. Jervis Drawings Collection of the Jervis Public Library on New York Heritage Digital Collections
Account of the New York Guard protection of the aqueduct in World War I

Aqueducts in New York (state)
Buildings and structures on the National Register of Historic Places in Manhattan
Hiking trails in New York (state)
Historic Civil Engineering Landmarks
National Historic Landmarks in New York City
National Register of Historic Places in Westchester County, New York
New York (state) historic sites
Water infrastructure of New York City
Water supply infrastructure on the National Register of Historic Places
Parks in Westchester County, New York
Transportation buildings and structures in Westchester County, New York
Transportation buildings and structures in Manhattan
Historic American Engineering Record in New York (state)
Interbasin transfer
Aqueducts on the National Register of Historic Places
Transportation buildings and structures on the National Register of Historic Places in New York (state)
National Historic Landmarks in New York (state)